Umuahala is a village in Ukwa West local government area, Abia State, Nigeria.

References

Populated places in Abia State
Villages in Igboland